The 2021 VCU Rams baseball team represented Virginia Commonwealth University during the 2021 NCAA Division I baseball season. The Rams played their home games at The Diamond as a member of the Atlantic 10 Conference. They were led by head coach Shawn Stiffler, in his 9th season at VCU.

VCU qualified for the NCAA tournament for the first time since 2015, and received their highest seeding (2) since 2001. They were eliminated in the Regional, with a final record of 38–16, including a program record 22-game win streak.

Previous season

The 2020 VCU Rams baseball team notched a 9–8 (0–0) regular season record. The season prematurely ended on March 12, 2020, due to concerns over the COVID-19 pandemic.

Player movement

Departures

Transfers

Signing Day Recruits
The following players signed National Letter of Intents to play for VCU in 2021.

Preseason

Coaches Poll 
The Atlantic 10 baseball coaches' poll was released on February 18, 2021. VCU was picked to win the Atlantic 10 regular season championship.

Personnel

Roster

Coaching Staff

Game log

Tournaments

Atlantic 10 Tournament

NCAA Starkville Regional

Rankings

Awards and honors

References

External links 
 VCU Baseball

Vcu
VCU Rams baseball seasons
VCU Rams baseball
VCU
Atlantic 10 Conference baseball champion seasons